Royal West Academy (commonly referred to as Royal West or RWA) is a public alternative anglophone secondary school in Montreal West, Quebec. Royal West has limited enrollment, and prospective students are only admitted after an entrance examination and interview. Royal West Academy is part of the English Montreal School Board (EMSB).

History
The grounds where Royal West is now located once belong to the Aberdeen School of Coteau Saint-Pierre, founded in 1894. It was renamed Montreal West High School in 1921. Ten years later, in 1931, the building was demolished and a larger building was built in its place. Between 1951 and 1959 an extension to the main structure was built to make way for an elementary school. The extension is referred to as the west wing.

In 1980, the elementary school was closed because of poor enrollment. The Royal Vale elementary school moved in, but was closed as well. In 1983, the Royal Vale French immersion high school and Montreal West High School merged to form Royal West Academy.

Until 1998 the school was within the Protestant School Board of Greater Montreal.

Admission process

The EMSB allows Royal West to choose the first 180 students who score the highest points on the entrance exams held, usually, in October.  The first 75-80 students with the highest grades get an "early acceptance"; the next 300 are interviewed, where they choose the next 110 that get to attend the following school year.  Royal West has also placed high in scholastic math competitions, including its rank of first in Quebec in 2006.

Student groups

Environment Committee
Royal West Academy's Environment Committee is made up of students in grades 8 through to 11 who share the common goal of protecting our natural environment. The committee holds a variety of events throughout the school year to raise awareness of numerous environmental issues, and sometimes directly influences EMSB policy. The committee has publishes a bi-monthly newsletter, the Eco-Ego, part of the school's monthly newsletter (the RWA News).

Notable graduates

Anthony Cheung, Hong Kong politician and academic
Tim Fletcher of The Stills, musician
Adam Gollner, author
Dan Guterman, Brazilian-Canadian producer, staff writer, The Colbert Report
Karl R. Hearne, film director
Anna Hopkins, television actress
Laurin Liu, politician, former NDP MP
Parker Mitchell, co-CEO and co-Founder of Engineers Without Borders Canada
Robert Naylor, film and television actor
Nick Nemeroff, comedian, Juno award nominee
Conrad Pla, Spanish-Canadian television actor
Jacob Tierney, actor
Kaya Turski, freestyle skier, Winter X Games gold medallist
Nik Witkowski, rugby centre for Canada national rugby union team & Coventry R.F.C., UK
Dorothy Yeats, Olympian and gold medallist at the inaugural Youth Olympic Games in wrestling (70 kg)

See also
 Garbage Bowl, played at Royal West Academy yearly since 1950

References

External links

Royal West Academy
Royal West Academy Student Life Association

English-language schools in Quebec
High schools in Montreal
Educational institutions established in 1983
English Montreal School Board
1983 establishments in Quebec
Montreal West, Quebec